The World Figure Skating Championships is an annual figure skating competition sanctioned by the International Skating Union in which figure skaters compete for the title of World Champion.

Men's competitions took place from January 29 to 30 in Davos, Switzerland. Ladies' competition took place on February 4 in Berlin, German Empire. There were only two competitors. Pairs' competition took place on February 4 also in Berlin, German Empire.

Results

Men

Judges:
 Ludwig Fänner 
 Tibor von Földváry 
 H. D. Faith 
 Guido Kupka 
 H. Günther 
 P. Birum 
 M. Holtz

Ladies

Judges:
 Gilbert Fuchs 
 Fritz Hellmund 
 O. Hüttig 
 F. Otto 
 Otto Schöning

Pairs

Judges:
 K. Eberhardt 
 Fritz Hellmund 
 O. Hüttig 
 P. Kersten 
 F. Otto 
 Max Rendschmidt 
 Otto Schöning

Sources
 Result list provided by the ISU
 01.02.1910 Suomen Urheilulehti no 3. page 76

World Figure Skating Championships
World Figure Skating Championships, 1910
World 1910
World 1910
World Figure Skating Championships, 1910
World Figure Skating Championships, 1910
1910s in Berlin
1910 in German sport
1910 in Swiss sport
January 1910 sports events
February 1910 sports events